Elaeocarpus eriobotryoides is a species of flowering plant in the Elaeocarpaceae family. It is endemic to Peninsular Malaysia. It is threatened by habitat loss.

References

eriobotryoides
Endemic flora of Peninsular Malaysia
Vulnerable plants
Taxonomy articles created by Polbot
Plants described in 1914